Anna Zemanová (née Sedláková; born 12 September 1959 in Topoľčany) is a Slovak environmentalist, folklorist and politician, who has sevrved as a member of the National Council since 2016.

Life outside of politics 
Zemanová studied geology at the Comenius University, graduating in 1983. She worked on the environmental issues in government and NGO sector.

Political career 
Zemanová became involved in politics in the late 1990s. From 2002 to 2006 she served as the major of Vajnory borough of Bratislava. In 2012, she joined the Freedom and Solidarity party, which she has represented in parliament since 2016.

Personal life 
Zemanová has four children.

References 

People from Topoľčany
Freedom and Solidarity politicians
Living people
1959 births
Members of the National Council (Slovakia) 2016-2020
Members of the National Council (Slovakia) 2020-present
Comenius University alumni
Female members of the National Council (Slovakia)
Slovak environmentalists
Women environmentalists
Mayors of places in Slovakia
Women mayors of places in Slovakia
21st-century Slovak women politicians